Godatale is a village in the North Western Province of Sri Lanka.

See also
List of towns in North Western Province, Sri Lanka

External links

Populated places in North Western Province, Sri Lanka